The 1992–93 OB I bajnokság season was the 56th season of the OB I bajnokság, the top level of ice hockey in Hungary. Seven teams participated in the league, and Ferencvarosi TC won the championship.

Regular season

Final round

5th-7th place

Playoffs

3rd place 
 Újpesti TE - Alba Volán Székesfehérvár 2:0 (5:4, 7:2)

Final 
 Ferencvárosi TC - Lehel SE Jászberény 3:2 (4:1, 0:4, 1:4, 5:2, 4:3)

External links
 Season on hockeyarchives.info

1992-93
Hun
OB